Elections to Three Rivers Council were held on 3 May 2007. One third of the council was up for election and the Liberal Democrat party stayed in overall control of the council.

After the election, the composition of the council was:
Liberal Democrat 31
Conservative 11
Labour 6

Election result

Ward results

References
2007 Three Rivers election result
Ward results

2007
2007 English local elections
2000s in Hertfordshire